Noisy Stylus is a turntablist group from Cologne, Germany. It was founded in 1997 and consists of four DJs: Adlib, Tre Styles, Tobeyer and Dynamike.

Noisy Stylus holds four national DJ Champion titles: German DMC Champion 2001, German DMC Team Champion 2002 & 2003, German International Turntablist Federation Team Champion 2004. They also hold two international titles: European International Turntablist Federation Team Champion 2004 & International Turntablist Federation Vice-World Team Champion 2004.

They have released four records, a complete album created entirely from scratching, as well as two 12"-singles, all on Beatz aus der Bude-Records. They also created various tracks for international compilations such as the Transmissions-CD on Asisphonics-Records or the late Return of the DJ Vol.V on Bomb Hip-Hop Records.

Discography

LPs/CDs 
 2005 – Table Manners (BADB-R-016, BADB-CD-010) 
Track list:
 Stand Back
 The Lesson
 Broccoli Wars
 Boom-Bah
 Stick 'em up
 Kindness
 Music Sucks
 Never Leave
 Spaceship Explorers
 Late Train
 Noisy Goreng
 Summertime
 Battle Mentality
 Surfin' Hawaii

Singles 
 2005 – "Summertime" (b/w Battle Mentality)
 2003 – "Superstar" featuring Olli Banjo (b/w Stick 'em up)
 2001 – "Broccoli Wars" (b/w Spaceship Explorers)

Battle-Tools 
 2004 – Snatched Breaks
 2003 – Tobeyer's Pizza Breaks
 2002 – Stylus Breaks
 2001 – Noisy Breaks

Compilations 
 2006 – Olli Banjo – Sparring 2 (Im Training)
 2006 – DJ Adlib – Adlibertine EP (Bring it to the Table)
 2005 – Various Artists – Cuts of Culture (Summertime)
 2005 – Various Artists – Movementality 2 (Stick 'em up)
 2005 – DJ D-Styles – Double Homicide Split (Mr. Arrogant remix)
 2004 – Various Artists – Return of the DJ Vol.V (Broccoli Wars)

See also
Turntablism
Phonograph
List of turntablists
Hip hop music

External links
Noisy Stylus
International Turntablist Federation USA
DMC Technics DJ World Championships
German biography, pictures and musikvideos

German DJs
Electronic dance music DJs